Lisbon District is a district located along the western coast of Portugal.  The district capital is the city of Lisbon, which is also the national capital. From its creation  until 1926, it included the area of the current Setúbal District.

Municipalities 

The district is composed of 16 municipalities:

 Alenquer
 Amadora
 Arruda dos Vinhos
 Azambuja
 Cadaval
 Cascais
 Lisbon
 Loures
 Lourinhã
 Mafra
 Odivelas
 Oeiras
 Sintra
 Sobral de Monte Agraço
 Torres Vedras
 Vila Franca de Xira

Summary of votes and seats won 1976-2022 

|- class="unsortable"
!rowspan=2|Parties!!%!!S!!%!!S!!%!!S!!%!!S!!%!!S!!%!!S!!%!!S!!%!!S!!%!!S!!%!!S!!%!!S!!%!!S!!%!!S!!%!!S!!%!!S!!%!!S
|- class="unsortable" align="center"
!colspan=2 | 1976
!colspan=2 | 1979
!colspan=2 | 1980
!colspan=2 | 1983
!colspan=2 | 1985
!colspan=2 | 1987
!colspan=2 | 1991
!colspan=2 | 1995
!colspan=2 | 1999
!colspan=2 | 2002
!colspan=2 | 2005
!colspan=2 | 2009
!colspan=2 | 2011
!colspan=2 | 2015
!colspan=2 | 2019
!colspan=2 | 2022
|-
| align="left"| PS || style="background:#FF66FF;"|38.3 || style="background:#FF66FF;"|25 || 25.8 || 15 || 28.1 || 17 || style="background:#FF66FF;"|35.8 || style="background:#FF66FF;"|21 || 19.8 || 12 || 21.2 || 12 || 29.7 || 16 || style="background:#FF66FF;"|44.3 || style="background:#FF66FF;"|24  || style="background:#FF66FF;"|42.7 || style="background:#FF66FF;"|23 || style="background:#FF66FF;"|38.7 || style="background:#FF66FF;"|20 || style="background:#FF66FF;"|44.1 || style="background:#FF66FF;"|23 || style="background:#FF66FF;"|36.4 || style="background:#FF66FF;"|19 || 27.5 || 14 || 33.5 || 18 || style="background:#FF66FF;"|36.7 || style="background:#FF66FF;"|20 || style="background:#FF66FF;"|40.8 || style="background:#FF66FF;"|21
|-
| align="left"| PSD || 16.4 || 10 || align=center colspan=4 rowspan=2|In AD || 21.8 || 13 || style="background:#FF9900;"|25.6 || style="background:#FF9900;"|15 || style="background:#FF9900;"|45.8 || style="background:#FF9900;"|28 || style="background:#FF9900;"|45.3 || style="background:#FF9900;"|25 || 29.0 || 15 || 27.3|| 14 || 35.7 || 18 || 23.7 || 12 || 25.1 || 13 || style="background:#FF9900;"|34.1 || style="background:#FF9900;"|18 || align=center colspan=2 rowspan=2|In PàF || 22.6 || 12 || 24.2 || 13
|-
| align="left"| CDS-PP || 13.2 || 8 || 11.7 || 7 || 8.1 || 4 || 3.7 || 2 || 4.0 || 2 || 9.4 || 5 || 8.5 || 4 || 8.5 || 4 || 8.2 || 4 || 11.0 || 5 || 13.8 || 7 || 4.4 || 2 || 1.7
|-
| align="left"| PCP/APU/CDU || 21.8 || 14 || 26.0 || 16 || 23.1 || 13 || 25.3 || 15 || 20.1 || 12 || 16.5 || 10 || 12.2 || 6 || 12.0 || 6 || 12.3 || 6 || 8.8 || 4 || 9.8 || 5 || 9.9 || 5 || 9.6 || 5 || 9.8 || 5 || 7.8 || 4 || 5.1 || 2
|-
| align="left"| UDP || 2.6 || 1 || 2.8 || 1 || 1.7 || 1 || colspan=26|
|-
| align="left"| AD || colspan=2| || style="background:#00FFFF;"|40.0 || style="background:#00FFFF;"|24 || style="background:#00FFFF;"|41.6 || style="background:#00FFFF;"|25 || colspan=26|
|-
| align="left"| PRD || colspan=8| || 21.3 || 13 || 6.9 || 4 || colspan=20|
|-
| align="left"| PSN || colspan=12| || 2.7 || 1 || colspan=18|
|-
| align="left"| BE || colspan=16| || 4.9 || 2 || 4.7 || 2 || 8.8 || 4 || 10.8 || 5 || 5.7 || 3 || 10.9 || 5 || 9.7 || 5 || 4.7 || 2
|-
| align="left"| PàF || colspan=26| || style="background:#00AAAA;"|34.7 || style="background:#00AAAA;"|18 || colspan=4|
|-
| align="left"| PAN || colspan=26| || 2.0 || 1 || 4.4 || 2 || 2.0 || 1
|-
| align="left"| CHEGA || colspan=28| || 2.0 || 1 || 7.8 || 4
|-
| align="left"| IL || colspan=28| || 2.5 || 1 || 7.9 || 4
|-
| align="left"| LIVRE || colspan=28| || 2.1 || 1 || 2.4 || 1
|-
! Total seats || colspan=2| 58 || colspan=10|56 || colspan=4|50 || colspan=2|49 || colspan=4|48 || colspan=6|47 || colspan=4|48
|-
! colspan=33|Source: Comissão Nacional de Eleições
|}

See also 

 Villages in the district of Lisbon:
 Abelheira
 Gouveia
 Varge Mondar

References

External links
 List of Civil Governors (1835-2008)

 
Districts of Portugal
Districts in Alentejo